Events from the year 1928 in the United States

Incumbents

Government 
 President: Calvin Coolidge (R-Massachusetts)
 Vice President: Charles G. Dawes (R-Illinois)
 Chief Justice: William Howard Taft (Ohio)
 Speaker of the House of Representatives: Nicholas Longworth (R-Ohio)
 Senate Majority Leader: Charles Curtis (R-Kansas)
 Congress: 70th

Events

January
 January 16
 U.S. murderer Ruth Snyder is executed at Ossining. 
 6th Pan-American Conference opens in Havana. Calvin Coolidge becomes the last sitting U.S. President until 2016 to visit Cuba.

February
 February 8 – British inventor John Logie Baird broadcasts a transatlantic television signal from London to Hartsdale, New York.
 February 25 – Charles Jenkins Laboratories of Washington, D.C. becomes the first holder of a television license from the Federal Radio Commission.

March
 March 12 – In California, the St. Francis Dam north of Los Angeles fails, killing 400.
 March 21 – Charles Lindbergh is presented the Medal of Honor for his first trans-Atlantic flight.

April
 April 10 – "Pineapple Primary": The Republican Party primary elections in Chicago are preceded by assassinations and bombings.
 April 28 – Tamiami Trail linking Tampa and Miami officially opens to traffic.

May
 May 10 – The first regular schedule of television programming begins in Schenectady, New York by the General Electric's television station W2XB (the station is popularly known as WGY Television, after its sister radio station WGY).
 May 15 – The animated short Plane Crazy is released by Disney Studios in Los Angeles, featuring the first appearances of Mickey and Minnie Mouse.
 May 19 – Mather Mine disaster
 May 26 – Airplane Coaster roller coaster opens at Playland, Rye, New York.
 May 29 – Palsgraf v. Long Island Railroad Co., a leading case in United States tort law on the question of liability to an unforeseeable plaintiff, is decided in the New York Court of Appeals.

June
 June 4 – Olmstead v. United States decided in the Supreme Court: wiretapped private telephone conversations, obtained by federal agents without judicial approval and subsequently used as evidence, do not violate the Fourth and Fifth Amendments to the Constitution.
 June 3 – Serial killer Albert Fish kidnaps and kills 10-year-old Grace Budd in New York.
 June 17 – Aviator Amelia Earhart starts her attempt to become the first woman to successfully cross the Atlantic Ocean. Wilmer Stultz is the pilot.
 June 29 – New York Governor Alfred E. Smith becomes the first Catholic nominated by a major political party for U.S. President, at the Democratic National Convention in Houston, Texas.
 June 29 – Outerbridge Crossing and Goethals Bridge in Staten Island, New York is opened

July
 July 4 – Jean Lussier goes over Niagara Falls in a rubber ball.
 July 6 – The world's largest hailstone falls in Potter, Nebraska.
 July 7 – The first machine-sliced, machine-wrapped loaf of bread is sold in Chillicothe, Missouri, using Otto Frederick Rohwedder's technology.
 July 12 – Mexican aviator Emilio Carranza dies in a solo plane crash in the New Jersey Pine Barrens, while returning from a goodwill flight to New York City.
 July 25 – The United States recalls its troops from China.

August
 August 16 – Murderer Carl Panzram is arrested in Washington, D.C. after killing about 20 people.
 August 22 – Alfred E. Smith accepts the Democratic presidential nomination, with WGY/W2XB simulcasting the event on radio and television.

September
 September 1 – Richard Byrd leaves New York for the Arctic.
 September 11 – Kenmore's WMAK station starts broadcasting in Buffalo, New York.
 September 16 – The 1928 Okeechobee Hurricane kills at least 2,500 people in Florida.

October
 October 9 – The New York Yankees defeat the St. Louis Cardinals, 4 games to 0, to win their 3rd World Series Title.
 October 12 – An iron lung respirator is used for the first time at Children's Hospital, Boston.
 October 19 – William Edward Hickman is executed at San Quentin State Prison, for the 1927 murder of 12-year-old Marion Parker.
 October 28 – Glenn Miller and Helen Burger marry in New York City.

November
 November 4 – At Park Central Hotel in Manhattan, Arnold Rothstein, New York City's most notorious gambler, is shot to death over a poker game.
 November 6 – U.S. presidential election, 1928: Republican Herbert Hoover wins by a wide margin over Democratic Governor of New York Alfred E. Smith.
 November 17 – The Boston Garden opens in Boston.
 November 18 – Mickey Mouse appears in Steamboat Willie, the third Mickey Mouse cartoon released, but the first sound film.

December
 December 5 – Police disperse a Sicilian gangs' meeting in Cleveland.
 December 21 – The U.S. Congress approves the construction of Boulder Dam, later renamed Hoover Dam.

Undated
 The Ford River Rouge Complex at Dearborn, Michigan, an automobile plant begun in 1917, is completed as the largest integrated factory in the world.
 W2XBS, RCA's first television station, is established in New York City.
 Eliot Ness begins to lead the prohibition unit in Chicago.
 The Protestant Episcopal Church in the United States of America ratifies a new revision of the Book of Common Prayer.

Ongoing
 Lochner era (c. 1897–c. 1937)
 On the roof gang, group of cryptologists and radiomen during World War II (1928–1941)
 U.S. occupation of Haiti (1915–1934)
 Prohibition (1920–1933)
 Roaring Twenties (1920–1929)

Sport 
April 14 - New York Rangers win their First Stanley Cup by defeating the Montreal Maroons 3 games to 2. All games were played at the Montreal Forum. The Rangers become the Second American team to win the Stanley Cup and the first since the Seattle Metropolitans in 1918

Births

January

 January 1 – William Henry Draper III, American venture capitalist 
 January 2
 Robert Goralski, American journalist (d. 1988)
 Dan Rostenkowski, American politician (d. 2010)
 January 5 – Walter Mondale, American politician, 42nd Vice President of the United States from 1977 to 1981 (d. 2021)
 January 6 – George H. Ross, American businessman
 January 7 – William Peter Blatty, American novelist and screenwriter (d. 2017)
 January 8 – Slade Gorton, American politician
 January 9 – Judith Krantz, American novelist (d. 2019)
 January 10 – Philip Levine, American poet (d. 2015)
 January 11
 Mitchell Ryan, American actor
 David L. Wolper, American television producer (d. 2010)
 January 12 – Lloyd Ruby, American race car driver (d. 2009)
 January 14 – Lauch Faircloth, American politician
 January 15
 James G. March, American sociologist (d. 2018)
 Joanne Linville, American actress
 January 16
 William Kennedy, American author
 Sidney Kimmel, American businessman, philanthropist and film producer 
 January 20 – Rudy Boesch, American soldier
 January 21 – Gene Sharp, American political theorist of nonviolent action (d. 2018)
 January 22 – Birch Bayh, American politician (d. 2019)
 January 30 – Harold Prince, American stage producer, director (d. 2019)

February

 February 1 – Tom Lantos, American politician (d. 2008)
 February 5 
 Andrew Greeley, American Catholic priest, fiction novelist (d. 2013)
 William J. Larkin Jr., American politician (d. 2019)
 February 8 – Jack Larson, American actor, producer and playwright (d. 2015)
 February 9
 Frank Frazetta, American illustrator (d. 2010)
 Roger Mudd, American journalist (d. 2021)
 February 14 – Norman Bridwell, American cartoonist (d. 2014)
 February 17 – Tom Jones, American lyricist
 February 18 – John Ostrom, American paleontologist (d. 2005)
 February 20
 Roy Face, American baseball player 
 Jean Kennedy Smith, American diplomat (d. 2020)
 February 22
 Paul Dooley, American actor 
 Clarence 13X, American religious leader, founder of the Nation of Gods and Earths (d. 1969)
 February 23 – Ralph Earnhardt, American race car driver (d. 1973)
 February 26 – Fats Domino, African-American pianist and singer-songwriter (d. 2017)

March

 March 3 – Bernice Sandler, American women's rights activist (d. 2019)
 March 5 – J. Hillis Miller, American literary critic (d. 2021)
 March 6 
 Delbert Daisey, American waterfowl wood carver, decoy maker (d. 2017)
 Dan Towler, American football player (d. 2001)
 March 7 – William Blankenship, American operatic tenor (d. 2017)
 March 7 – Martin Davis, American mathematician and computer scientist (d. 2023)
 March 9 – Keely Smith, American singer (d. 2017)
 March 10 – James Earl Ray, American assassin (d. 1998)
 March 12
 Edward Albee, American playwright (d. 2016)
 Ellen Raskin, American author and illustrator (d. 1984)
 March 14
 Frank Borman, American astronaut
 Earl Smith, American baseball center fielder (d. 2014)
 March 15 – Bob Wilber, American clarinetist and saxophonist 
 March 17 – Barbara Kloka Hackett, American judge (d. 2018)
 March 18 – Julia Mullock, American-Korean royal (d. 2017)
 March 19
 John Hall Buchanan Jr., American politician (d. 2018)
 Arthur Cook, American sport shooter
 Patrick McGoohan, American-born British-based actor of Irish descent (d. 2009)
 March 20  
 E. D. Hirsch, American author, critic and academic 
 Ed Macauley, American basketball player (d. 2011)
 March 23 – Mark Rydell, American actor, director and producer
 March 24 
 Byron Janis, American pianist
 Mel Rosen, American track and field coach (d. 2018)
 Lloyd W. Bailey, faithless elector from North Carolina (died 2020)
 March 25
 Aubrey Dunn Sr., American politician (d. 2012)
 Jim Lovell, American astronaut
 March 27 – Douglas Applegate, politician (d. 2021)
 March 29 – Vincent Gigante, American Mafia gangster (d. 2005)
 March 31 – Lefty Frizzell, American country music performer (d. 1975)

April

 April 1 – George Grizzard, American actor (d. 2007)
 April 2 – Joseph Bernardin, American cardinal (d. 1996)
 April 3
 Don Gibson, American country music singer-songwriter (d. 2003)
 Kevin Hagen, American actor (d. 2005)
 Earl Lloyd, African-American basketball player (d. 2015)
 April 4
 Maya Angelou, African American poet and novelist (d. 2014)
 Estelle Harris, American actress
 Bill Ryan, American journalist (d. 1997)
 April 5 – Tony Williams, American singer (d. 1992)
 April 6
 Joi Lansing, American actress (d. 1972)
 James D. Watson, American geneticist, recipient of the Nobel Prize in Physiology or Medicine
 April 7
 James Garner, American actor, producer (d. 2014)
 Alan J. Pakula, American producer, director (d. 1998)
 April 8 – Fred Ebb, American composer (d. 2004)
 April 9
 Floyd Spence, American politician (d. 2001)
 Tom Lehrer, American singer-songwriter, satirist, pianist and mathematician
 April 11 – Ethel Kennedy, American human-rights campaigner, wife of Robert F. Kennedy
 April 16 – Night Train Lane, American football player (d. 2002)
 April 17 
 Cynthia Ozick, American writer
 Victor Lownes, American businessman (d. 2017)
 April 18 – Arnold Oss, American ice hockey player 
 April 19 – Richard Garwin, American physicist 
 April 20 – Robert Byrne, American chess player (d. 2013)
 April 23 – Shirley Temple, American actress, singer, dancer, businesswoman, and diplomat (d. 2014)
 April 24 – Johnny Griffin, African-American jazz saxophonist (d. 2008)
 April 25 – Cy Twombly, American artist (d. 2011)
 April 27 – Fred Weintraub, American film, television producer (d. 2017)
 April 28 – Eugene Merle Shoemaker, American geologist (d. 1997)

May

 May 1 – Sonny James, American country singer (d. 2016)
 May 3
 Jeanne Bal, American actress and model (d. 1996)
 Dave Dudley, American country singer (d. 2003)
 May 4
 Betsy Rawls, American professional golfer
 Joseph Tydings, American politician
 May 5 – Marshall Grant, American musician (d. 2011)
 May 7 – John Ingle, American actor (d. 2012)
 May 8
 Robert Conley, American journalist (d. 2013)
 Ted Sorensen, American lawyer, writer, and presidential adviser (d. 2010)
 May 9
 Ralph Goings, American painter (d. 2016)
 Pancho Gonzales, American tennis player (d. 1995)
 May 11 – Vern Rapp, American baseball player, coach and manager (d. 2015)
 May 12
 Burt Bacharach, American composer, songwriter, record producer, pianist, and singer (d. 2023)
 Manuel Lujan Jr., American politician (d. 2019)
 May 14 – Dub Jones, American R&B singer (d. 2011)
 May 16 – Billy Martin, American baseball player, manager (d. 1989)
 May 18
 Pernell Roberts, American actor (d. 2010)
 Sara Shane, American actress 
 May 19 – Dolph Schayes, American basketball player (d. 2015)
 May 21 – Alice Drummond, American actress (d. 2016)
 May 22 – T. Boone Pickens, American businessman (d. 2019)
 May 23 – Rosemary Clooney, American singer and actress (d. 2002)
 May 24 – Leonard B. Sand, American judge (d. 2016)
 May 25 – Mary Wells Lawrence, American advertising executive 
 May 26 – Jack Kevorkian, American right-to-die advocate (d. 2011)
 May 29 – George A. Sinner, American politician (d. 2018)
 May 31
 Consuelo Crespi, American fashion icon (d. 2010)
 Gloria Schiff, American fashion icon (d. 2019)

June

 June 3 – Louise Daniel Hutchinson, American historian and academic (d. 2014)
 June 6 
 George Deukmejian, American politician (d. 2018)
 Ed Fury, American actor, bodybuilder and model
 June 9 – Jackie Mason, American comedian (d. 2021)
 June 12
 Vic Damone, American singer (d. 2018)
 Richard M. Sherman, American songwriter
 June 13 – John Forbes Nash, Jr., American mathematician, recipient of the Nobel Memorial Prize in Economic Sciences (d. 2015)
 June 19 
 Elizabeth Connelly, American politician (d. 2006)
 Nancy Marchand, American actress (d. 2000)
 June 20 
 Eric Dolphy, American jazz musician (d. 1964)
 Martin Landau, American actor (d. 2017)
 June 21 
 Charles D. Baker, American businessman, former U.S. government official
 June 22
 Alfred M. Gray, Jr., general 
 Ralph Waite, actor, political activist (The Waltons) (d. 2014)
 June 23
 Leon Fleischer, concert pianist
 Ray Hyman, Professor Emeritus of Psychology
 Pete Ladygo, American football player (d. 2014)
 June 24
 Lester Grinspoon, Associate Professor Emeritus of Psychiatry at Harvard Medical School
 Lawrence A. Skantze, United States Air Force general (d. 2018)
 June 25 
 Bill Russo, pianist and composer (d. 2003)
 Alex Toth, animator and screenwriter (d. 2006)
 Robert Dean Hunter, politician
 Edwin Mills, economist 
 John A. Wickham Jr., United States Army military officer 
 June 26
 Danford B. Greene, actor (d. 2015)
 Bill Sheffield, politician
 June 27 – Edward B. Cottingham, politician
 June 28 – Patrick Hemingway, second son of author Ernest Hemingway
 June 29 
 Bill Bagley, politician 
 James Lincoln Collier, journalist, musician and author 
 Nick Testa, professional baseball catcher, coach (d. 2018)
 June 30 – Nathaniel Tarn, poet, essayist, anthropologist and translator

July

 July 4 – Chuck Tanner, American baseball player and manager (d. 2011)
 July 5
 Lorraine Fisher, American professional baseball player (d. 2007)
 Ernie Kell, American politician (d. 2017)
 Bruce Nickells, American harness racing driver, trainer
 July 6
 Richard R. Larson, American politician (d. 2016)
 Wally Osterkorn, American basketball player (d. 2012)
 Eugene Ostroff, historian and museum curator (d. 1999)
 July 8 – Pat Adams, painter, printmaker
 July 9 – Vince Edwards, actor (Ben Casey) (d. 1996)
 July 10
 John Glenn, Major League Baseball outfielder
 Herb Johnson, American football player
 July 11 – Conrad Janis, American jazz trombonist and actor
 July 12
 Elias James Corey, chemist, Nobel Prize laureate
 Hayden White, historian (d. 2018)
 July 13
 Bob Crane, American actor (Hogan's Heroes) (d. 1978)
 Daryl Spencer, American professional baseball player (d. 2017)
 Leroy Vinnegar, American musician (d. 1999)
 July 14 – Nancy Olson, American actress
 July 15 – Tom Troupe, American actor, writer 
 July 16 – Jim Rathmann, American race car driver (d. 2011)
 July 17 – Joe Morello, American jazz drummer (d. 2011)
 July 18 
 Baddiewinkle, (b. Helen Ruth Elam Van Winkle), American internet personality
 Billy Harrell, American baseball player and scout (d. 2014)
 July 19 – Priscilla Johnson McMillan, journalist and historian (d. 2021)
 July 20 – Cecilia Suyat Marshall, American civil rights activist and historian (d. 2022)
 July 22
 Orson Bean, American film, television and stage actor (d. 2020)
 Robert Bergland, American politician (d. 2018)
 Keter Betts, American jazz bassist (d. 2005)
 Nick Galifianakis, American politician
 Stu Locklin, American Major League Baseball outfielder (d. 2016)
 July 23 – Leon Fleisher, American classical pianist (d. 2020)
 July 26
 Joe Jackson, African-American talent manager (d. 2018
 Stanley Kubrick, American film director (d. 1999)

August

 August 1
 James R. Dixon, American professor (d. 2015)
 Jack Shea, American film, television director (d. 2013)
 August 3 – Janet Abu-Lughod, American sociologist (d. 2013)
 August 4 – Gerard Damiano, American adult film director (d. 2008)
 August 5 – Bogdan Maglich, American physicist (d. 2017)
 August 6 – Andy Warhol, American figure in the visual art movement pop art (d. 1987)
 August 7 – Herbert H. Bateman, American politician (d. 2000)
 August 8 – Jane Stoll, American professional baseball player (d. 2000)
 August 9
 Dolores Wilson, American coloratura soprano (d. 2010)
 Bob Cousy, American basketball player
 Martin Greenfield, American tailor and Holocaust survivor 
 Camilla Wicks, American violinist (d. 2020)
 Zeb Alley, American lawyer, lobbyist, and politician (d. 2013)
 August 10
 Don Bustany, American radio, television broadcaster (d. 2018)
 Jimmy Dean, American country musician, entrepreneur (d. 2010)
 Eddie Fisher, American singer and actor (d. 2010)
 August 12 
 Bob Buhl, American baseball player (d. 2001)
 Micki Marlo, American model and singer (d. 2016)
 August 16
 George Ahlgren, American rower who competed at the 1948 Summer Olympics (d. 1951) 
 Eydie Gormé, American singer (d. 2013)
 Ann Blyth, American actress, singer 
 Wyatt Tee Walker, American pastor, civil rights leader, theologian, and historian (d. 2018)
 August 18 – Marge Schott, American baseball team owner (d. 2004)
 August 19 – Laurette Luez, American actress (d. 1999)
 August 20 – Frank Rosolino, American jazz trombonist (d. 1978)
 August 21 – Art Farmer, American jazz trumpeter, flugelhorn player (d. 1999)
 August 22 – Ray Marshall, American politician
 August 23 – Marian Seldes, American actress (d. 2014)
 August 25
 Kayo Dottley, American football player (d. 2018)
 Jason Epstein, American editor and publisher (d. 2022)
 Karl Korte, American composer
 August 28 – Ed Salem, American football quarterback, defensive back (d. 2001)
 August 30
 Shirley Huffman, American politician (d. 2018)
 Johnny Mann, American composer, arranger, and singer (d. 2014)
 August 31 – James Coburn, American actor (d. 2002)

September

 September 1 – George Maharis, American actor
 September 2 – Horace Silver, American jazz pianist, composer and arranger (d. 2014)
 September 3 – James Churgin, geologist and oceanographer
 September 4 – Dick York, American actor (d. 1992)
 September 6 – Robert M. Pirsig, American philosopher (d. 2017)
 September 7 
 Donald Henderson, American epidemiologist, leader of global smallpox eradication program (d. 2016)
 Al McGuire, basketball player, coach, and commentator (d. 2001)
 September 9 – Sol LeWitt, American artist (d. 2007)
 September 10 – Walter Ralston Martin, American Baptist Christian minister and author (d. 1989)
 September 11 
 Earl Holliman, American actor 
 William X. Kienzle, American author (d. 2001)
 September 12
 Robert Irwin, American painter
 Muriel Siebert, American stockbroker (d. 2013)
 September 13 – Robert Indiana, American contemporary artist (d. 2018)
 September 14
 Dick Clark, American politician
 Park Honan, American academic, author (d. 2014)
 September 15 
 Cannonball Adderley, American saxophonist (d. 1975)
 Henry Silva, American actor 
 September 16 – Patricia Wald, American judge (d. 2019)
 September 19 – Adam West, American actor (d. 2017)
 September 20
 Jack Edwards, American politician 
 Donald Hall, American poet, United States Poet Laureate (d. 2018)
 Ruth Richard, American female professional baseball player (d. 2018)
 Martin Tolchin, American journalist and author (d. 2022)
 September 22
 James Lawson, African-American civil rights activist, minister and professor
 Eugene Roche, American actor (d. 2004)
 Richard Stone, American politician
 September 23
 Bernie Custis, American and Canadian football player (d. 2017)
 Hollie Pihl, American judge (d. 2018)
 September 25 – Victor Gold, American journalist, press secretary (d. 2017)
 September 26 – Robert D. Ray, American lawyer, politician (d. 2018)
 September 27 – Garry Watson, American child actor
 September 28 – Koko Taylor, African-American singer (d. 2009)

October

 October 1
 George Peppard, American film, television actor (d. 1994)
 Erica Yohn, American actress (d. 2019)
 October 2 – George "Spanky" McFarland, American child actor (d. 1993)
 October 3 
 Edward L. Moyers, American railroad executive (d. 2006)
 Richard Stolley, American journalist and magazine editor (d. 2021)
 October 4 – Alvin Toffler, American futurologist (d. 2016)
 October 7 
 Muriel Bevis, baseball player (d. 2002)
 Herb Rich, American football player (d. 2008)
 Abraham Woods, civil rights leader (d. 2008)
 October 8 – M. Russell Ballard, American businessman and religious leader
 October 14 – Gary Graffman, American concert pianist
 October 16 – Eileen Ryan, American actress
 October 17
 Lerone Bennett Jr., African-American scholar, author (d. 2018)
 Jimmy Breslin, American journalist (d. 2017)
 October 18 – Keith Jackson, American sports commentator, journalist, author, and radio personality (d. 2018)
 October 21 
 Vern Mikkelsen, American professional basketball player (d. 2013)
 Whitey Ford, American baseball player
 October 25
 Jeanne Cooper, American actress (d. 2013)
 Anthony Franciosa, American actor (d. 2006)
 Marion Ross, American actress
 October 27 – Waldo Holmes, American musician and songwriter 
 October 30 
 Ann Russell Miller, socialite and nun (d. 2021)
 Daniel Nathans, American microbiologist, recipient of the Nobel Prize in Physiology or Medicine (d. 1999)
 October 31 – Roy Romer, American politician

November

 November 3 
George Yardley, basketball player (d. 2004)
 Nick Holonyak, electrical engineer and inventor (d. 2022)
 November 4 – George Stanich, high jumper
 November 6
 Norman Carlberg, sculptor and printmaker (d. 2018)
 Zara Steiner, American-English historian and academic (d. 2020)
 November 7 – Herbert Flam, tennis player (d. 1980)
 November 9 
 Anne Sexton, poet (d. 1974)
 November 11 – Ernestine Anderson, jazz and blues singer (d. 2016)
 November 12 – Bobby Baker, political adviser to Lyndon B. Johnson (d. 2017)
 November 13 – Steve Bilko, baseball player (d. 1978)
 November 14 – Kathleen Hughes, actress 
 November 15 
 C. W. McCall, country singer and politician 
 Seldon Powell, jazz and soul woodwind player (d. 1997)
 November 16 – Clu Gulager, actor and director
 November 17 
 Rance Howard, actor (d. 2017)
 Anna Meyer, female professional baseball player
 November 18
 Norman Baker, explorer (d. 2017)
 Sheila Jordan, singer and pianist 
 Lloyd R. Leavitt Jr., air force lieutenant general (d. 2016)
 November 20 – Pete Rademacher, American boxer
 November 23 – Elmarie Wendel, American actress and singer (d. 2018)
 November 25 – Jimmy Johnson, blues guitarist (d. 2022)
 November 29 – Paul Simon, American politician (d. 2003)
 November 30 – Joe B. Hall, American basketball coach

December

 December 1 – Sarge Ferris, American professional poker player (d. 1989)
 December 2 – Edwin Kessler, American atmospheric scientist (d. 2017)
 December 7 – Noam Chomsky, American linguist
 December 9 – Dick Van Patten, American actor (d. 2015)
 December 10
 Dan Blocker, American actor (Bonanza) (d. 1972)
 Barbara Nichols, American actress (d. 1976)
 December 12
 Helen Frankenthaler, American painter (d. 2011)
 Lonesome Sundown, American blues musician (d. 1995
 December 15
 Ernest Ashworth, American country music singer (d. 2009)
 Jimmy Nelson, American ventriloquist
 Jerry Wallace, American singer (d. 2008)
 December 16
 Terry Carter, American actor and filmmaker 
 Philip K. Dick, American science fiction author (d. 1982)
 Bruce Ames, American biochemist
 December 17 – George Lindsey, American actor (d. 2012)
 December 19 – Nathan Oliveira, American painter, printmaker, and sculptor (d. 2010)
 December 20 – Jack Christiansen, American football player and coach (d. 1986)
 December 21
 Ed Nelson, American actor (d. 2014)
 Colleen Townsend, American actress and author 
 December 23
 Billy Cook, American spree killer (d. 1952)
 Buddy Harman, American drummer and session musician (d. 2008)
 Roger Jepsen, American politician
 December 24 – Nancy Tuckerman, American secretary (d. 2018)
 December 25
 Irish McCalla, American actress, model (d. 2002)
 Dick Miller, American actor (d. 2019)
 December 26 – Martin Cooper, American inventor, "father of the mobile phone"
 December 27 – Richard Freed, American music critic (d. 2022)
 December 28 – Bill Gradison, American politician 
 December 29 – June Preston, American child actress (d. 2022)
 December 30 – Bo Diddley, African-American musician (d. 2008)
 December 31 – Hugh McElhenny, American football player (d. 2022)

Deaths
 January 1 – Loie Fuller, dancer (born 1862)
 January 3
 Dorothy Donnelly, actress and songwriter (born 1880)
 Emily Stevens, actress (born 1882)
 January 6 – Alvin Kraenzlein, American athlete (born 1876)
 January 12 – Ruth Snyder, murderer (born 1895)
 January 13 – Frederick Arthur Bridgman, artist (born 1847)
 January 21 – John A. Kimberly, entrepreneur, co-founder of Kimberly-Clark (born 1838)
 January 22 – Victor Blue, American admiral (born 1865)
 January 25 – Charles Gorman, American actor (born 1865)
 March 7 – Robert Abbe, surgeon (born 1851)
 March 19 – Nora Bayes, singer and actress (born 1880)
 April 2 – Theodore William Richards, recipient of the Nobel Prize in Chemistry (born 1868)
 April 8 – Wendell P. Bowman, army major general (born 1847)
 April 22
 Warner B. Bayley, admiral (born 1845)
 Frank Currier, actor (born 1857)
 April 25 – Floyd Bennett, aviator (born 1890)
 May 8 – Clara Williams, actress (born 1888)
 May 18 – Bill Haywood, labor leader (born 1869)
 May 19 – Bessie Van Vorst, campaigning journalist (died 1873)
 June 6 – John D. Works, U.S. Senator from California from 1911 to 1917 (born 1847)
 June 16 – Mark Keppel, Superintendent of Los Angeles County Schools (born 1867)
 June 22
 A. B. Frost, illustrator (born 1851)
 George Siegmann, actor (born 1882)
 June 24 – Holbrook Blinn, actor (born 1872)
 July 1 
 Avery Hopwood, playwright (born 1882)
 Frankie Yale, gangster (born 1893)
 August 29 – George N. Bliss, soldier, Medal of Honor recipient (born 1837)
 October 8 – Larry Semon, actor (born 1889)
 October 20 – Mary Ingalls, blind older sister of author Laura Ingalls Wilder (born 1865)
 October 24 – Arthur Bowen Davies, artist (born 1863)
 October 30 – Robert Lansing, Secretary of State (born 1864)
 December 11 – Lewis Howard Latimer, inventor (born 1848)
 December 14 – Theodore Roberts, actor (born 1861)
 December 16 – Elinor Wylie, poet and novelist (born 1885)
 December 25 – Fred Thomson, silent film actor (born 1890)

See also
 1928 in American television
 List of American films of 1928
 Timeline of United States history (1900–1929)

References

External links
 

 
1920s in the United States
United States
United States
Years of the 20th century in the United States